{{DISPLAYTITLE:Chi2 Orionis}}

Chi2 Orionis (Chi2 Ori / χ2 Orionis / χ2 Ori)  is a B-type supergiant star in the constellation of Orion.  It has an apparent visual magnitude of 4.63 but being quite distant, and heavily extinguished it burns with the greatest absolute visual light magnitude among stars in Orion within the near reaches of the galaxy, 0.9 of a magnitude brighter than Rigel.  Since 1943, the spectrum of this star has served as one of the stable anchor points by which other stars are classified.  It is considered to be a member of the Gemini OB1 association.

In apparent brightness it ranks, within Orion, admitting the higher published mean brightness of much more variable stars ranked above it, 35th.

Chi1 Orionis is an unrelated, yellow, main sequence star over two degrees away.

Spectrum
χ2 Orionis has a B2 bright supergiant spectrum and is one of the standard B2 Ia stars.  It has been reported as having unusually narrow absorption lines and some weak emission lines and was included as one of the original Be stars. It is no longer treated as a Be star since many supergiants show some emission features at high resolution and Be stars is usually defined to exclude supergiants.

Variability

χ2 Orionis was listed as having likely small amplitude variability in photometry for the Third Catalogue of Stars measured in the Geneva Observatory Photometric System, specifically varying by 22 thousandths of a magnitude.  It was included in the General Catalogue of Variable Stars based on Hipparcos satellite photometry with a magnitude range (in the Hipparchos photometric system) of 4.68 - 4.72 and a period of 2.8 days.  A detailed study of the Hipparcos photometry confirmed the star as an α Cyg variable and gave the amplitude of variation as 0.057 magnitudes.

References

Orion (constellation)
B-type supergiants
Orionis, 62
Orionis, Chi2
041117
028716
Alpha Cygni variables
2135
BD+20 1233